The following is a list of Commanding Officers of USCGC Eagle (WIX-327). There have been a total of 31 Eagle captains during her  years under USCG commission, and 5 during her 10 years of commission as Horst Wessel under the Kriegsmarine.

Many of Eagles past commanders have gone on to serve with distinction, include ADM Robert J. Papp Jr., who served as the 24th Commandant of the Coast Guard from 2010–2014, and VADM James C. Irwin, who served as vice commandant from 1986 to 1988. In all, 9 former Eagle commanders and two Horst Wessel commanders achieved flag rank.

Horst Wessel's first commander, German VADM August Thiele served with distinction as commander, Kampfgruppe Thiele during WW2, earning the Knight's Cross with Oak Leaves, and KADM Kurt Weyher continued in the Imperial German Navy tradition of Count Luckner as a Merchant raider, earning the post-war Great Cross of Merit.

KMS Horst Wessel 
(Rank at assumption of command)

Kapitan zur See August Thiele, 1936–1938
Korvettenkapitan Kurt Weyher, January 1939 – September 1939
Kapitanleutnant Martin Kretschmar, March 1940 – May 1940
Fregattenkapitan Peter E. Eiffe, March 1941 – November 1942
Kapitanleutnant Berthold Schnibbe, November 1942 – May 1945

USCGC Barque Eagle 
(Rank at assumption of command)

}

References

Lists of mariners
United States Coast Guard captains
United States Coast Guard Academy people
United States Coast Guard lists
Sea captains